Claude May (1913–2009) was a French film actress.

Filmography

References

Bibliography
 Goble, Alan. The Complete Index to Literary Sources in Film. Walter de Gruyter, 1999.

External links

1913 births
2009 deaths
French stage actresses
French film actresses
Actresses from Paris
20th-century French actresses